Bishop Stephen Lepcha is the serving Bishop of the Roman Catholic Diocese of Darjeeling.

Early life 
He was born in Suruk, Darjeeling, West Bengal, India on 22 December 1952.

Priesthood 
He was ordained a Catholic priest on 15 December 1982.

Episcopate 
He was appointed Bishop of Darjeeling on 14 June 1997 and Ordained on 8 December 1997.

See also

List of Catholic bishops of India

References

Living people
People from West Bengal

1952 births